, also spelled Jojima or Johjima, may refer to:

Places 
 Jōjima, Fukuoka

People 
 Kenji Jōjima, a Japanese baseball player
 Takatsugu Jōjima, a Japanese navy admiral
 Tsukasa Jōjima, a fictional character in One: Kagayaku Kisetsu e